This is a list of the models who have appeared in the American edition of Penthouse magazine and were either named Pet of the Month or Pet of the Year from September 1969 to the present. Pet of the Year names are in bold type and are typically featured in the January issue of the year for which they are selected. Unlike Playboy, it may be several years before a model becomes "Pet of the Year" after their initial centerfold. No model was selected in 1985.

Contrary to what has been written over the years by various media, the first Pet of the Year was not Evelyn Treacher. (Treacher was on the cover of the first US edition, September 1969 and was named the first Pet of the Month.) The selection for the American edition of the magazine was not announced until the May 1971 issue. A few months later in the September 1971 issue, the first US Pet of the Year was selected and pictured on the cover, the winner being Stephanie McLean.

Pets of the Month
Sources:

1969–1979

1980–1989

1990–1999

2000–2009

2010–2019

2020–present

See also
 List of Playboy Playmates of the Month
 List of Playboy Playmates of the Year

References

External links
 Official Penthouse website
 Official Penthouse magazine website

 
Lists of female models